The 2022–23 season is 32nd season of Odessa football club "Chornomorets" in the championships / cups of Ukraine, and 85th season in the history of the club. This season "Chornomorets" competes in Ukrainian Premier League and Ukrainian Cup.

Timeline

August 2022 
 August 23, 2022 In the match of 1st round of the national championship Odesa team played in Kyiv, and lost 0:1 against FC "Veres".
 August 27, 2022 Match of the 2nd round of ukrainian championship "sailors" played again in Kyiv, where they tied 0:0 against the team of "Metalist 1925".

September 2022 
 September 4, 2022 In the match of 3rd round of the national championship Odesa team played at home, where they tied 1:1 against the team of "Inhulets".
 September 10, 2022 Match of the 4th round of ukrainian championship "sailors" played in Lviv, where they lost to "Shakhtar" (Donetsk) with a score of 1:2.

October 2022 
 October 2, 2022 In the "home" match of 5th round of the national championship, "Chornomorets" played in Kovalivka, where they lost to "Oleksandriya" with a score of 1:2.
 October 8, 2022 Match of the 6th round of ukrainian championship "sailors" played in Mynai, and lost against "Vorskla" 1:2.
 October 18, 2022 In the "home" match of 8th round of the national championship, "Chornomorets" played in Kovalivka, where they lost to "Zorya" with a big score of 0:4.
 October 24, 2022 Match of the 9th round of ukrainian championship "sailors" played again in Kovalivka, where they drew 1:1 with the local "Kolos".
 October 30, 2022 In the match of 10th round of the national championship, "Chornomorets" played in Uzhhorod, and lost (0:1) to the "Dnipro-1" team.

November 2022 
 November 6, 2022 Match of the 11th round of ukrainian championship "sailors" played at home, where they lost to "Dynamo" (Kyiv) with a score of 0:3.
 November 10, 2022 In the match of 12th round of the national championship, "Chornomorets" played in the village Mynai, and beat the local club (1:0). It was first victory of Odessa team in official matches of the current season.
 November 14, 2022 "Sailors" played 13th round match of the championship of Ukraine in Odesa, where they defeated FC "Lviv" with a score of 2:0. Vitaliy Yermakov and Maksym Voytikhovskyi scored their first goals as part of "Chornomorets".
 November 25, 2022 In the match of 15th round of the national championship Odesa team played at home, where they tied 0:0 against the team of "Metalist" (Kharkiv).

December 2022 
 December 2, 2022 "Sailors" played postponed 7th round match of the championship of Ukraine in Odesa, where they lost to the team "Kryvbas" (Kryvyi Rih) with a score of 0:1.
 December 7, 2022 In the postponed match of 14th round of the national championship, "Chornomorets" in Lviv played 2:2 against the local team "Rukh".

March 2023 
 March 4, 2023 "Sailors" played 16th round match of the championship of Ukraine in Rivne, and beat 3:1 the local club "Veres". Badibanga, Alefirenko and Hladkyi scored their first goals as part of "Chornomorets". Badibanga scored his first goal in UPL matches.
 March 11, 2023 In the match of 17th round of the national championship, "Chornomorets" played 1:1 at home against the team "Metalist 1925" from Kharkiv.
 March 13, 2023 "Chornomorets" suspended cooperation with its sponsor "Parimatch".
 March 19, 2023 "Sailors" played 18th round match of the championship of Ukraine in Petrove, and beat 2:1 the local club "Inhulets". Hadida scored his first goal as part of the Odesa team, and in UPL matches.

Competitions

Ukrainian Premier League

Results summary

Results by round

References

FC Chornomorets Odesa seasons
Chornomorets Odesa